Al-Wusaita is a subject of Baladiyah al-Batha and one of the oldest neighborhoods of the city in southern Riyadh, Saudi Arabia, inhabited mostly by overseas Asians. It shares proximity with Jabrah and Al Dirah neighborhoods.

References 

Neighbourhoods in Riyadh